Terence Riley (November 6, 1954 – May 17, 2021) was an American architect and museum curator. He was the chief curator of architecture and design at the Museum of Modern Art from 1992 to 2006.

Early life and education 
Riley was born in Elgin, Illinois, son of Philip Riley a printer, and Mary Jo (Lundberg) Riley, a homemaker. He grew up in Woodstock, Illinois, and graduated from the University of Notre Dame with a B.Arch in 1978, followed by an M.Arch at Columbia University in 1982.

Career 
In 1984, Riley formed the firm Keenen/Riley in 1984 with John Keenen. In 1990, he opened the Arthur Ross Architecture Gallery at Columbia, and was recruited by Philip Johnson a year later to work at the Museum of Modern Art, becoming Philip Johnson Chief Curator for architecture and design in 1992. He helped to found the MoMA/P.S.1 Young Architects Program. In 2006 he became director of the Miami Art Museum, stepping down in 2009 to return to architectural practice in Miami.

References

1954 births
2021 deaths
American architecture critics
People associated with the Museum of Modern Art (New York City)
Directors of museums in the United States
University of Notre Dame alumni
Columbia University alumni
Exhibition designers
American architectural historians